Elections for the Croydon London Borough Council are held every four years to elect 70 councillors. The last ward boundary changes came into force at the 2018 local elections.

Political control
The first elections to the council were held in 1964, ahead of the new system coming into full effect in 1965. Political control of the council since 1964 has been held by the following parties:

Leadership
Prior to 2022, political leadership was provided by the leader of the council. The leaders from 1965 to 2022 were:

In 2022 the council changed to having directly-elected mayors. The mayor since 2022 has been:

Council elections
 1964 Croydon London Borough Council election
 1968 Croydon London Borough Council election
 1971 Croydon London Borough Council election (boundary changes took place but the number of seats remained the same)
 1974 Croydon London Borough Council election
 1978 Croydon London Borough Council election (boundary changes increased the number of seats by ten)
 1982 Croydon London Borough Council election
 1986 Croydon London Borough Council election
 1990 Croydon London Borough Council election
 1994 Croydon London Borough Council election (boundary changes took place but the number of seats remained the same)
 1998 Croydon London Borough Council election (boundary changes took place but the number of seats remained the same)
 2002 Croydon London Borough Council election (boundary changes took place but the number of seats remained the same) 
 2006 Croydon London Borough Council election
 2010 Croydon London Borough Council election
 2014 Croydon London Borough Council election
 2018 Croydon London Borough Council election (boundary changes took place but the number of seats remained the same)
 2022 Croydon London Borough Council election (boundaries remained the same, but the introduction of the Mayor of Croydon increased the number of seats by 1)

Borough result maps

Councillors by party
The party holding the executive Mayor, and as a result executive power, is the Conservative Party. No party holds a majority of Councillors. Since the 2022 Croydon London Borough Council election the composition of the Council is as follows:

By-election results

1964-1968
There were no by-elections.

1968-1971

1971-1974

1974-1978

1978-1982

1982-1986

1986-1990

1990-1994

The by-election was called following the resignation of Cllr. Susan T. Taylor.

The by-election was called following the resignation of Cllr. David L. Congdon.

The by-election was called following the death of Cllr. John D. P. Yaxley.

The by-election was called following the resignation of Cllr. Anthony J. Slatcher.

The by-election was called following the resignation of Cllr. Ann A. Allan.

1994-1998

The by-election was called following the resignation of Cllr. Sherwan H. Chowdhury.

The by-election was called following the death of Cllr. Bruce T. H. Marshall.

The by-election was called following the resignation of Cllr. Alison J. Roberts.

The by-election was called following the resignation of Cllr. Geraint R. Davies.

1998-2002

The by-election was called following the resignation of Cllr. Louisa P. Woodley.

The by-election was called following the resignation of Cllr. Valerie Shawcross.

2002-2006

The by-election was called following the resignation of Cllr. Alexander Burridge.

The by-election was called following the death of Cllr. Mary M. Walker.

The by-election was called following the resignation of Cllr. Audrey-Marie M. Yates.

2006-2010

The by-election was called following the resignation of Cllr. Paula M. Shaw.

The by-election was called following the death of Cllr. Jonathan M. Driver.

2010-2014
There were no by-elections.

2014-2018

The by-election was triggered by the death of Councillor Gerry Ryan.

The by-election was triggered by the resignation of Councillor Emily Benn to pursue a job in New York City, United States

2018-Present

The by-election was caused following the death of Councillor Maggie Mansell.

Wards

There are 24 wards which represent Croydon Council. All Croydon Council seats were up for re-election for the first time since the 2002 elections, during the election on 4 May 2006. Previously Labour held control of the council. In the election, the Conservatives took 10 seats from Labour and one from the Liberal Democrats. Since the election, Cllr Mike Mogul defected from Labour to the Conservatives adding another Conservative councillor, whilst Cllr Enley Taylor left the Conservative Group and Cllr Jonathan Driver, the Mayor at the time, died.

In the 2010 elections Labour gained six seats from the Conservatives, giving the council's political composition as:

References

External links
Croydon Council